Mariusz Prudel (born 21 January 1986) is a male beach volleyball player from Poland. He competed in the 2012 Summer Olympics with his partner Grzegorz Fijałek.  The other teams in their pool, group D, were Aleksandrs Samoilovs and Ruslans Sorokins (Latvia), Jake Gibb and Sean Rosenthal (USA) and the South African team of Freedom Chiya and Grant Goldschmidt.  They lost to the Latvian team, but beat the South African and American teams.  Next they played the Swiss pair of Sascha Heyer and Seba Chevallier in the last 16, winning two sets to nil.  In the quarterfinals they lost to the Brazilian team of Emanuel Rego and Alison Cerutti.

Prudel and Fijałek were considered to be medal contenders in the 2012 Olympics. He and Fijałek were ranked fifth before the competition began after placing 25th at The Hague Open, the pair's 2012 debut. However, the two placed seventh in the Olympic qualifiers. In July 2012, Prudel and Fijałek won a bronze medal at the Berlin Grand Slam.

Prudel was born in 1986 in his hometown of Rybnik, Poland. He is coached by Martin Olejnak and is married to Ani Prudel.

References

1986 births
Living people
Polish beach volleyball players
Men's beach volleyball players
Olympic beach volleyball players of Poland
Beach volleyball players at the 2012 Summer Olympics
Beach volleyball players at the 2016 Summer Olympics
People from Rybnik
Sportspeople from Silesian Voivodeship